The Pocomoke City Chicks were a minor league baseball team based in Pocomoke City, Maryland. They played in the Class-D Eastern Shore League from 1922 to 1940. In 1922 and 1923, the team was called the Pokomoke City Salamanders.  From 1937 to 1939, the team was known as the Pocomoke City Red Sox before changing the name for its final season. They were an affiliate of the Brooklyn Dodgers in 1937.

Year-by-year record

References

External links
Pocomoke City, Maryland minor league history

Defunct minor league baseball teams
Brooklyn Dodgers minor league affiliates
1922 establishments in Maryland
1940 disestablishments in Maryland
Baseball teams established in 1922
Baseball teams disestablished in 1940
Baseball teams in Maryland
Pocomoke City, Maryland
Defunct baseball teams in Maryland
Defunct Eastern Shore League teams